The Puente de España, or the Bridge of Spain, was a bridge that spanned the Pasig River in the Philippines, connecting the areas of Binondo and Ermita, Manila on Calle Nueva (now E.T. Yuchengco St) with central Manila. The span was the oldest established in the country before it was damaged by flood in 1914. The bridge was replaced by the Jones Bridge that was started in 1916 and completed in 1921, located one block downriver from Puente de España on Calle Rosario (now Quintin Paredes St).

Puente Grande

The first bridge to ever cross the Pasig River was the Puente Grande, a ten-span bridge opened in 1630 by the Spanish colonial government. Work on the bridge started in 1626 during the term of Spanish Governor Fernando de Silva, who reported that the city had decided to build a stone bridge over the river. The beam bridge connected Intramuros and with the business district of Binondo, making travel across the river easier and faster than the ferry service that existed before. The bridge was completed in 1630, under the term of Juan Niño de Tabora. The bridge was built without cost to the treasury, as the Sangleys (Chinese) had paid for it as it relieved them of ferryboat charges.

Bridge design
Construction work was directed by the Recollect priest Lucas de Jesus María. The bridge as built consisted of stone piers and a wooden superstructure. At the south end of the bridge was a structure called Fortín y Mira (small fort and look-out). Its use was to guard this approach to the city as part of the defense of Manila. The wooden superstructure, besides being more easily and cheaply built, had a military value in that communications between the two parts of the city, as divided by the river, could be easily and quickly destroyed by destroying the woodwork. This was done during an insurrection of the Chinese in 1638.

Construction of the bridge
The engineering work of the bridge is credited to Antonio Herrera, an Augustinian friar. To expose the river bed, Herrera diverted half of the water of the river into the moats and esteros (canals) that existed along the east and south fronts of the walled city, and then cut a channel from the west end of the moat, on the south (near Paseo de Luneta) to the sea. By building heavy dikes, he removed the water from a part of the river bed, which permitted the construction of the piers for half of the bridge. The same plan was followed for the piers of the other half. The piers were built of a local stone, known locally as Guadalupe adobe stone named from where the stones were quarried (now Brgy. Guadalupe Viejo in Makati); its formation being a volcanic tuff.

Puente de Piedra
In 1814, the wooden superstructures were replaced with stone arches and the stone piers were strengthened. The bridge was also called Puente de Piedra (Stone Bridge), while the old name remained popular. The earthquake of 3 June 1863, one of the strongest to hit the Philippines, levelled most of Manila. The bridge was damaged when the central piers of the bridge sank.

Puente de Barcas
While the Puente Grande was being assessed and repaired, a temporary pontoon bridge called Puente de Barcas (Bridge of Boats) was constructed one block below on Calle Rosario. In the middle of the bridge, the spans were supported by cascos, or large flat-bottomed boats common in the area.

During the reconstruction of the old bridge, the two piers near the centre were removed lessening the number of spans to eight. Then, two steel-ribbed central spans were used to span the space left by the removed piers. The bridge was opened on 1 January 1875 and was renamed as Puente de España.

American colonial period
The bridge remained unchanged until 1901 during the American colonial era when the bridge was widened to accommodate more pedestrians and vehicles, even with the construction of nearby Santa Cruz Bridge that was started in 1900. With the addition of additional lanes of traffic, as a result, the street lamps on the bridge were removed. In 1905, tracks were laid on the bridge to accommodate the "tranvías", a tram (streetcar) system that ran throughout Manila.

Destruction

In September, 1914, non-stop rains flooded the streets of Manila and swelling the Pasig River. The flood damaged the central pier of the bridge and was removed. A temporary truss bridge was installed after a few months over the remaining spans while a replacement bridge was constructed one block downriver.

Jones Bridge

In 1916, the construction was started on a neoclassical reinforced concrete arch bridge by the American colonial government across Calle Rosario on the site of the old temporary Puente de Barcas. The span was renamed as Jones Bridge after former Virginia Rep. William Atkinson Jones, who was the principal author of the Philippine Autonomy Act of 1916, a bill assuring the future independence of the Philippines. The bridge was completed and opened for traffic in 1921. Soon after, the Bridge of Spain was dismantled ending its long history. Its replacement, Jones Bridge, was destroyed by bombs during the Battle of Manila in World War II and was replaced by the present bridge (Jones Bridge II).

See also

 Spanish East Indies
 Captaincy General of the Philippines
 Intramuros Grand Marian Procession
 Gates of Intramuros
 Fort Santiago

References

External links

The River and the Sea: Bridges, Ports and Lighthouses for other bridges on the Pasig River and other structures built during the Spanish Colonial Period.

Former buildings and structures in Manila
Bridges in Manila
History of the Philippines (1565–1898)
Spanish colonial infrastructure in the Philippines